The 2006–07 All-Ireland Intermediate Club Hurling Championship was the third staging of the All-Ireland Intermediate Club Hurling Championship since its establishment by the Gaelic Athletic Association in 2004.

The All-Ireland final was played on 10 March 2007 at Croke Park in Dublin, between Robert Emmetts from London and Killimordaly. Robert Emmetts won the match by 1-14 to 0-08 to become the first London team to win an All-Ireland title.

Results

Leinster Intermediate Club Hurling Championship

Final

Munster Intermediate Club Hurling Championship

Quarter-final

Semi-finals

Final

All-Ireland Intermediate Club Hurling Championship

Final

Championship statistics

Miscellaneous

 Robert Emmetts became the first London-based club to win an All-Ireland title in any grade of hurling.

References

All-Ireland Intermediate Club Hurling Championship
All-Ireland Intermediate Club Hurling Championship
All-Ireland Intermediate Club Hurling Championship